Boomtown (also known as Boomtown Fair) is a British music festival held annually on the Matterley Estate in South Downs National Park, near Winchester, Hampshire. It was first held in 2009 and has been held at its current site since 2011. Its diverse line-up of bands, DJs and speakers perform on many different stages each a part of a district with its own individual theme. Each yearly event is known as a Chapter and expands on the story line from the previous year, told through the sets, live actors and many forms of alternate reality games. The festival site is split into several districts, and the narrative is reflected in the design of the districts, streets and venues, which are populated by hundreds of actors to play the role of inhabitants. The large scale of the sets and infrastructure require six weeks of construction, and a month of disassembly.

The event is centered around a set of common beliefs and principles, mainly supporting the progressive ideas of environmentalism and social equality, as set out in its vision code, The Six Pillars of Boomtown.

The festival is run by Boomtown Festival UK Limited, partially owned by Live Nation UK (18%), and originally founded by company directors Chris Rutherford and Luke Marcus 'Lak' Mitchell, both from Bristol. In July 2019, the organizers were granted a capacity increase by Winchester City Council, bringing the total number of people allowed to 76,999, consisting of 58,000 ticket holders, 17,999 crew, artists, traders and guests, plus 1,000 local residents with day tickets.

The increase was to come into effect from 2020, but the event was cancelled due to the COVID-19 pandemic. After the rebooted 2021 event, and a smaller-scale event known as 'Boom Village', were both cancelled due to the pandemic - citing a lack of insurance support from the British government, the festival returned in 2022.

History

2000s 
Boomtown Fair was created when Rutherford and Mitchell, who had grown up in the festival scene,
decided that music festivals lacked atmosphere, and that many genres were being overlooked. The first chapter, Boomtown Begins, took place on 7 August 2009 and was held at the Speech House Hotel, Coleford, Gloucestershire. The second event saw the festival move to the Stowe Landscape Gardens in Buckingham, Buckinghamshire and the third festival was relocated to the Matterley Estate in Winchester, where it has remained.

2010s 
The seventh chapter, in 2015, saw the introduction of Psychedelic Forest, the second psychedelic trance stage (the first was Tribe of Ffog). The 2016 fair saw further expansion with Sector 6, introduced as a way to even the spread of bass-heavy music across the site, and Whistler's Green green fields area over the hill between the Lion's Den and Downtown areas, mostly secluded from the rest of the site.

The tenth chapter, in 2018, brought the new districts Disorder Alley, Paradise Heights (in place of Mayfair), and Copper County (in place of the Wild West). The same year, festival organizers hoped to increase the capacity of the festival to 80,000, but the application was rejected. Instead they were allowed to open a day early, but only if attendees arrived using 'sustainable transport', in coaches, shuttle bus or cars with more than three people.

 
In August 2019, Boomtown was granted licensing approval to open a 3,500 capacity event space at their Bristol headquarters, which opened in November as Area 404. The year's fair installment, chapter eleven, introduced the new Area 404 district in place of Sector 6 providing the festivals home for techno and acid house music. The event was focused around the "Leave No Trace" mantra. Encouraging attendees to take all their rubbish and tents with them as they leave, and also banning single-use plastics from all of the on-side stalls. As a result of this push, the festival saw a 50% reduction in tents and equipment left behind. The festival introduced ballot bins as a part of this initiative in an effort to encourage responsible disposal of cigarette butts. Built by TerraCycle, attendees can vote on opinion polls by putting their butts in one of two slots; their waste was recycled into furniture.

2020s 
Chapter Twelve was to see the introduction of a new district Forgotten Valley as a replacement for Whistler's Green. The new district was to encapsulate the Kidztown and Floating Lotus stages, but saw the replacement of The Lighthouse stage with a new area known as Ancient Futures. On 30 April 2020, Chapter 12 was cancelled due to the COVID-19 pandemic.

The festival's return in 2021 saw a storyline reset and, like the very first year, was known as Chapter One, subtitled The Gathering. With this change in canon, the event also saw a redesigned layout, consolidating the site into three main areas: The Main City (located in what was previously Downtown – the Matterley Bowl), The Forests and Woodland areas, and the Campsites and their villages. The move meant that the majority of stages and venues were now located within the natural bowl, with the campsites able to occupy more of the flat land in the surrounding landscape.

After an announcement from Prime Minister Boris Johnson on Monday, 22 February announcing the roadmap for the removal of restrictions in England, public confidence in the 2021 festival season increased. Following this news, many festivals in the UK saw a huge increase in ticket sales, with the organizers of the Reading and Leeds festivals stating they were 'very confident' the summer's events would go ahead. By Thursday 25 February, all remaining Boomtown tickets had sold out; 48,000 in total.

On 20 April 2021 however, Boomtown announced that it would be cancelled for the second year in a row. Organisers cited the lack of a government insurance scheme to cover COVID-19-related cancellations of music festivals, stating that "for an independent event as large and complex as Boomtown, this means a huge gamble into an eight-figure sum to lose if we were to venture much further forward, and then not be able to go ahead due to COVID." While the organizers planned to hold a smaller event known as Boom Village in August, on 14 July notwithstanding the lifting of restrictions in the UK, Boom Village was cancelled due to safety concerns over rising numbers of new COVID-19 cases.

The festival returned in 2022, with a reset story line and new layout, subtitled 'Chapter One: The Gathering'. On 17 August 2022, Boomtown co-founders Lak Mitchell and Christopher Rutherford released a statement confirming that the festival, previously the largest independent in the UK, had sold a 45% stake citing increasing financial pressure, with Live Nation UK and Gaiety each taking 18%, and SJM Concerts 9%.

Layout 
Across the four areas of Temple Valley, Hilltop, Downtown and Forgotten Valley there are 14 separate districts, each with an individual identity seen through the set dressing, wandering theatrical performances, and music genres on show. Each district has at least one main stage and a selection of smaller street or theatrical venues as well as small and medium-sized music venues. The festival contains over 25 'main' stages and an additional 80 street venues.

The large main stages of Relic, Nucleus and Lion's Den differ from standard stages as they are designed to accommodate crowds several thousand strong, with vast stage sets at the centre with food and drink concessions in their own arenas.
Kidztown is the dedicated children's area at Boomtown, introduced in the second year, co-ordinated by qualified child and youth experts, including play-workers, early years specialists, artists and performers.

The 2021 installment is set to feature a reworked and scaled-down site layout as a part of the festival's recovery measures in response to the COVID-19 pandemic. Aside from the Forest Party stages, each of the districts will be relocated to inside the Matterley Bowl in a new, more condensed layout for the Downtown area. Some of the campsites will be moved to the fields immediately surrounding the Bowl, and the overall footprint for the event is down-scaled.

Districts and Stages 
The site layout evolves and changes with each installment, with new areas and venues being introduced and previous iterations renewed. A number of the stages have remained consistent throughout the history of the festival, including the Kidztown, Lions Den and Town Centre stages which have featured since the 2011 fair, through many different incarnations.

Evolution of districts and main stages (at Matterley Estate)
 – Previous district / main stage.
 – Current district / main stage.

Location 

The festival takes place in South East England on the Matterley Estate in Hampshire on the grounds of the South Downs National Park, 3 miles from Winchester. The grounds are situated between the A31 and A272.

The grounds have been the home of a number of music festivals and concerts over the years, including Creamfields in its inaugural year of 1998, Homelands from 1999 till 2005 and Glade Festival in 2009. Because of this long history with a number of iconic events, many consider the grounds to be firmly entrenched in the roots of many notable acts and genres, especially with regards to dance music, underground dance music and other electronic music.

The site is split into 3 areas: the Downtown area is contained within the Matterley Bowl, the natural valley Temple Valley features the area of the same name, and the Hilltop area extends across the crest of the hill that is the mid-ground between these two areas – it is also the geographical centre of the site.
The site is divided by the steep hill between the Downtown and Hilltop areas with participants taking either Hippie Highway or The Stairs to travel between the two. A number of stages feature within the natural features of the sites. The Hidden Woods, Tribe of Frog, Tangled Roots and Psychedelic Forest stages are set within forests under tree canopies. The Lions Den stage is also set within a natural amphitheatre.

Elsewhere on-site, the motocross track within the Matterley Basin has in the past held the British round of the World Championship, as well as the Motocross of Nations. The site has also hosted the Tough Mudder endurance test series.

Line-ups

Charitable activities 
Donations to various charities are made each year from the festival's profits; in 2015 these were the Energy Revolution Initiative, Winchester Youth Counselling and Trinity Winchester. Tickets are donated to charity for raffles and competitions, and the festival works with Oxfam, MyCauseUK and Isle of Wight Air Ambulance who provide stewards. The festival also produces a fundraising CD at Christmas. Since 2014, the festival have provided free children's arts & craft workshops at a pop-up event in nearby Winchester.

For the 2019 event, Boomtown partnered with TreeSisters, an organization focusing on reforestation with women, to plant one tree for every ticket bought (48,000). After the event, it was announced that the partnership planted 71,725 trees.

Incidents and deaths 
During the 2011 festival, Deborah Jeffery, 45 from Winchester suffered a fatal heart attack after taking ecstasy.

In 2013, Ellie Rowe, 18 from Glastonbury, Somerset, died after consuming alcohol and Ketamine. The incident occurred the same day Ketamine was reclassified from a class C to class B drug in the UK. In the years following the tragedy, Wendy Teasdill, Ellie's mother, has become an advocate for on-site drug testing, saying the facilities may have saved her life.

The following year, Lisa Williamson, 31, from Hereford, was found hanged in a campsite toilet after using drugs.

In 2016, Olivia Christopher, 18, from Chesham, Buckinghamshire, was discovered dead in her tent after a suspected drug overdose. It is believed she had consumed a cocktail of cocaine, Ketamine, LSD and MDMA and alcohol. The police seized £79,000 of drugs at the festival, with an additional £55,000 worth being placed in amnesty bins at the gates. The same year, a discarded cigarette started a fire which destroyed more than 80 cars.

In the weeks leading up to the 2017 event, the construction of the city was hampered by bad weather, which contributed to delays at the gates, with some guests queuing for up to 10 hours to enter the site. The rest of the event proceeded without incident.

In 2019, the festival saw very high winds, causing widespread damage to tents in all camping areas, as a result of fencing barriers blown onto the grounds. In addition, the Relic main-stage stage was closed during a performance by Shy FX after a piece of debris from the stage was blown onto the crowd. All subsequent acts that day were moved to the Lion's Den stage. The Relic stage re-opened the next day. No injuries were reported.

Awards and nominations

DJ Magazine's top 50 Festivals

Drum & Bass Awards

A Greener Festival

UK Festival Awards

See also
List of electronic music festivals
 List of music festivals in the United Kingdom

References

External links

 
  
 Boomtown Source (unofficial festival blog)

2009 establishments in England
Music festivals established in 2009
Counterculture festivals
Music festivals in Hampshire
Electronic music festivals in the United Kingdom
Rave culture in the United Kingdom